is an airport located in Okushiri, Okushiri Island, Hokkaidō, Japan.

Airlines and destinations

References

External links

 Airport Guide Okushiri Airport - Japan Airlines
 Hokkaidō Prefecture - Okushiri Airport

Airports in Hokkaido